The Canadian House of Commons Standing Committee on Procedure and House Affairs (PROC) is a standing committee composed of the four political parties of the Government of Canada that is responsible for the procedural and administrative matters relating to the House of Commons of Canada.  It has 12 members, including the three party Whips. This committee is the striking committee, which chooses the members of the other House committees.

Mandate
The 12-member standing committee includes the Whips from each of the three parties in the House of Commons of Canada. The Standing Committee on Procedure and House Affairs Committee is responsible for a number of procedural, and administrative matters relating to the House of Commons.  This includes matters such as Private Members' Business, questions of parliamentary privilege and review of the Standing Orders.

Membership

Sub-Committees
 Subcommittee on Agenda and Procedure (SPRO) 
 Subcommittee on Private Members' Business (SMEM)

External links
 Committee List

References

Procedure